Alfredo Pereira de Mello, commonly known as Mica, (15 October 1904 – 10 March 1989) was a Brazilian football player who played as a midfielder. Mica is considered one of the best players that the baiano football ever produced and one of its first heroes. He also was a member of the Brazilian squad at the 1923 Copa America.

Career
Mica started his career from the Yankee and won the Torneio Início da Bahia of 1921. Botafogo-BA which was one of the biggest clubs in Bahia at the time signed him in 1922 and he led them to two championship titles.

International career
Mica played in the 1923 Copa America alongside legendary Nilo, but Brazil eventually finished fourth. He was the first player outside the Rio-São Paulo states to be called up to the Brazil national team. No footballer from Bahia would play for the national team until 1987.

Honours
 :pt:Torneio Início da Bahia:1921
 Campeonato Baiano: 1922, 1923

References

External links
 Profile on Zerozero
 Profile em Sport.de

1904 births
1989 deaths
Sportspeople from Salvador, Bahia
Brazilian footballers
Brazil international footballers
Association football midfielders